The alkaline earth metal strontium (38Sr) has four stable, naturally occurring isotopes: 84Sr (0.56%), 86Sr (9.86%), 87Sr (7.0%) and 88Sr (82.58%). Its standard atomic weight is 87.62(1).

Only 87Sr is radiogenic; it is produced by decay from the radioactive alkali metal 87Rb, which has a half-life of 4.88 × 1010 years (i.e. more than three times longer than the current age of the universe). Thus, there are two sources of 87Sr in any material: primordial, formed during nucleosynthesis along with 84Sr, 86Sr and 88Sr; and that formed by radioactive decay of 87Rb. The ratio 87Sr/86Sr is the parameter typically reported in geologic investigations; ratios in minerals and rocks have values ranging from about 0.7 to greater than 4.0 (see rubidium–strontium dating). Because strontium has an electron configuration similar to that of calcium, it readily substitutes for calcium in minerals.

In addition to the four stable isotopes, thirty-two unstable isotopes of strontium are known to exist, ranging from 73Sr to 108Sr. Radioactive isotopes of strontium primarily decay into the neighbouring elements yttrium (89Sr and heavier isotopes, via beta minus decay) and rubidium (85Sr, 83Sr and lighter isotopes, via positron emission or electron capture). The longest-lived of these isotopes, and the most relevantly studied, are 90Sr with a half-life of 28.9 years, 85Sr with a half-life of 64.853 days, and 89Sr (89Sr) with a half-life of 50.57 days. All other strontium isotopes have half-lives shorter than 50 days, most under 100 minutes.

Strontium-89 is an artificial radioisotope used in treatment of bone cancer; this application utilizes its chemical similarity to calcium, which allows it to substitute calcium in bone structures. In circumstances where cancer patients have widespread and painful bony metastases, the administration of 89Sr results in the delivery of beta particles directly to the area of bony problem, where calcium turnover is greatest. 
Strontium-90 is a by-product of nuclear fission, present in nuclear fallout. The 1986 Chernobyl nuclear accident contaminated a vast area with 90Sr. It causes health problems, as it substitutes for calcium in bone, preventing expulsion from the body. Because it is a long-lived high-energy beta emitter, it is used in SNAP (Systems for Nuclear Auxiliary Power) devices. These devices hold promise for use in spacecraft, remote weather stations, navigational buoys, etc., where a lightweight, long-lived, nuclear-electric power source is required.

In 2020, researchers have found that mirror nuclides 73Sr and 73Br were found to not behave identically to each other as expected.

List of isotopes 

|-
| rowspan=2|73Sr
| rowspan=2 style="text-align:right" |38
| rowspan=2 style="text-align:right" | 35
| rowspan=2|72.96597(64)#
| rowspan=2|>25 ms
| β+ (>99.9%)
| 73Rb
| rowspan=2|1/2−#
| rowspan=2|
| rowspan=2|
|-
| β+, p (<.1%)
| 72Kr
|-
| 74Sr
| style="text-align:right" | 38
| style="text-align:right" | 36
| 73.95631(54)#
| 50# ms [>1.5 µs]
| β+
| 74Rb
| 0+
|
|
|-
| rowspan=2|75Sr
| rowspan=2 style="text-align:right" | 38
| rowspan=2 style="text-align:right" | 37
| rowspan=2|74.94995(24)
| rowspan=2|88(3) ms
| β+ (93.5%)
| 75Rb
| rowspan=2|(3/2−)
| rowspan=2|
| rowspan=2|
|-
| β+, p (6.5%)
| 74Kr
|-
| 76Sr
| style="text-align:right" | 38
| style="text-align:right" | 38
| 75.94177(4)
| 7.89(7) s
| β+
| 76Rb
| 0+
|
|
|-
| rowspan=2|77Sr
| rowspan=2 style="text-align:right" | 38
| rowspan=2 style="text-align:right" | 39
| rowspan=2|76.937945(10)
| rowspan=2|9.0(2) s
| β+ (99.75%)
| 77Rb
| rowspan=2|5/2+
| rowspan=2|
| rowspan=2|
|-
| β+, p (.25%)
| 76Kr
|-
| 78Sr
| style="text-align:right" | 38
| style="text-align:right" | 40
| 77.932180(8)
| 159(8) s
| β+
| 78Rb
| 0+
|
|
|-
| 79Sr
| style="text-align:right" | 38
| style="text-align:right" | 41
| 78.929708(9)
| 2.25(10) min
| β+
| 79Rb
| 3/2(−)
|
|
|-
| 80Sr
| style="text-align:right" | 38
| style="text-align:right" | 42
| 79.924521(7)
| 106.3(15) min
| β+
| 80Rb
| 0+
|
|
|-
| 81Sr
| style="text-align:right" | 38
| style="text-align:right" | 43
| 80.923212(7)
| 22.3(4) min
| β+
| 81Rb
| 1/2−
|
|
|-
| 82Sr
| style="text-align:right" | 38
| style="text-align:right" | 44
| 81.918402(6)
| 25.36(3) d
| EC
| 82Rb
| 0+
|
|
|-
| 83Sr
| style="text-align:right" | 38
| style="text-align:right" | 45
| 82.917557(11)
| 32.41(3) h
| β+
| 83Rb
| 7/2+
|
|
|-
| style="text-indent:1em" | 83mSr
| colspan="3" style="text-indent:2em" | 259.15(9) keV
| 4.95(12) s
| IT
| 83Sr
| 1/2−
|
|
|-
| 84Sr
| style="text-align:right" | 38
| style="text-align:right" | 46
| 83.913425(3)
| colspan=3 align=center|Observationally Stable
| 0+
| 0.0056
| 0.0055–0.0058
|-
| 85Sr
| style="text-align:right" | 38
| style="text-align:right" | 47
| 84.912933(3)
| 64.853(8) d
| EC
| 85Rb
| 9/2+
|
|
|-
| rowspan=2 style="text-indent:1em" | 85mSr
| rowspan=2 colspan="3" style="text-indent:2em" | 238.66(6) keV
| rowspan=2|67.63(4) min
| IT (86.6%)
| 85Sr
| rowspan=2|1/2−
| rowspan=2|
| rowspan=2|
|-
| β+ (13.4%)
| 85Rb
|-
| 86Sr
| style="text-align:right" | 38
| style="text-align:right" | 48
| 85.9092607309(91)
| colspan=3 align=center|Stable
| 0+
| 0.0986
| 0.0975–0.0999
|-
| style="text-indent:1em" | 86mSr
| colspan="3" style="text-indent:2em" | 2955.68(21) keV
| 455(7) ns
|
|
| 8+
|
|
|-
| 87Sr
| style="text-align:right" | 38
| style="text-align:right" | 49
| 86.9088774970(91)
| colspan=3 align=center|Stable
| 9/2+
| 0.0700
| 0.0694–0.0714
|-
| rowspan=2 style="text-indent:1em" | 87mSr
| rowspan=2 colspan="3" style="text-indent:2em" | 388.533(3) keV
| rowspan=2|2.815(12) h
| IT (99.7%)
| 87Sr
| rowspan=2|1/2−
| rowspan=2|
| rowspan=2|
|-
| EC (.3%)
| 87Rb
|-
| 88Sr
| style="text-align:right" | 38
| style="text-align:right" | 50
| 87.9056122571(97)
| colspan=3 align=center|Stable
| 0+
| 0.8258
| 0.8229–0.8275
|-
| 89Sr
| style="text-align:right" | 38
| style="text-align:right" | 51
| 88.9074507(12)
| 50.57(3) d
| β−
| 89Y
| 5/2+
|
|
|-
| 90Sr
| style="text-align:right" | 38
| style="text-align:right" | 52
| 89.907738(3)
| 28.90(3) y
| β−
| 90Y
| 0+
|
|
|-
| 91Sr
| style="text-align:right" | 38
| style="text-align:right" | 53
| 90.910203(5)
| 9.63(5) h
| β−
| 91Y
| 5/2+
|
|
|-
| 92Sr
| style="text-align:right" | 38
| style="text-align:right" | 54
| 91.911038(4)
| 2.66(4) h
| β−
| 92Y
| 0+
|
|
|-
| 93Sr
| style="text-align:right" | 38
| style="text-align:right" | 55
| 92.914026(8)
| 7.423(24) min
| β−
| 93Y
| 5/2+
|
|
|-
| 94Sr
| style="text-align:right" | 38
| style="text-align:right" | 56
| 93.915361(8)
| 75.3(2) s
| β−
| 94Y
| 0+
|
|
|-
| 95Sr
| style="text-align:right" | 38
| style="text-align:right" | 57
| 94.919359(8)
| 23.90(14) s
| β−
| 95Y
| 1/2+
|
|
|-
| 96Sr
| style="text-align:right" | 38
| style="text-align:right" | 58
| 95.921697(29)
| 1.07(1) s
| β−
| 96Y
| 0+
|
|
|-
| rowspan=2|97Sr
| rowspan=2 style="text-align:right" | 38
| rowspan=2 style="text-align:right" | 59
| rowspan=2|96.926153(21)
| rowspan=2|429(5) ms
| β− (99.95%)
| 97Y
| rowspan=2|1/2+
| rowspan=2|
| rowspan=2|
|-
| β−, n (.05%)
| 96Y
|-
| style="text-indent:1em" | 97m1Sr
| colspan="3" style="text-indent:2em" | 308.13(11) keV
| 170(10) ns
|
|
| (7/2)+
|
|
|-
| style="text-indent:1em" | 97m2Sr
| colspan="3" style="text-indent:2em" | 830.8(2) keV
| 255(10) ns
|
|
| (11/2−)#
|
|
|-
| rowspan=2|98Sr
| rowspan=2 style="text-align:right" | 38
| rowspan=2 style="text-align:right" | 60
| rowspan=2|97.928453(28)
| rowspan=2|0.653(2) s
| β− (99.75%)
| 98Y
| rowspan=2|0+
| rowspan=2|
| rowspan=2|
|-
| β−, n (.25%)
| 97Y
|-
| rowspan=2|99Sr
| rowspan=2 style="text-align:right" | 38
| rowspan=2 style="text-align:right" | 61
| rowspan=2|98.93324(9)
| rowspan=2|0.269(1) s
| β− (99.9%)
| 99Y
| rowspan=2|3/2+
| rowspan=2|
| rowspan=2|
|-
| β−, n (.1%)
| 98Y
|-
| rowspan=2|100Sr
| rowspan=2 style="text-align:right" | 38
| rowspan=2 style="text-align:right" | 62
| rowspan=2|99.93535(14)
| rowspan=2|202(3) ms
| β− (99.02%)
| 100Y
| rowspan=2|0+
| rowspan=2|
| rowspan=2|
|-
| β−, n (.98%)
| 99Y
|-
| rowspan=2|101Sr
| rowspan=2 style="text-align:right" | 38
| rowspan=2 style="text-align:right" | 63
| rowspan=2|100.94052(13)
| rowspan=2|118(3) ms
| β− (97.63%)
| 101Y
| rowspan=2|(5/2−)
| rowspan=2|
| rowspan=2|
|-
| β−, n (2.37%)
| 100Y
|-
| rowspan=2|102Sr
| rowspan=2 style="text-align:right" | 38
| rowspan=2 style="text-align:right" | 64
| rowspan=2|101.94302(12)
| rowspan=2|69(6) ms
| β− (94.5%)
| 102Y
| rowspan=2|0+
| rowspan=2|
| rowspan=2|
|-
| β−, n (5.5%)
| 101Y
|-
| 103Sr
| style="text-align:right" | 38
| style="text-align:right" | 65
| 102.94895(54)#
| 50# ms [>300 ns]
| β−
| 103Y
|
|
|
|-
| 104Sr
| style="text-align:right" | 38
| style="text-align:right" | 66
| 103.95233(75)#
| 30# ms [>300 ns]
| β−
| 104Y
| 0+
|
|
|-
| 105Sr
| style="text-align:right" | 38
| style="text-align:right" | 67
| 104.95858(75)#
| 20# ms [>300 ns]
|
|
|
|
|
|-
| 106Sr
| style="text-align:right" | 38
| style="text-align:right" | 68
| 
| 
|
|
|
|
|
|-
| 107Sr
| style="text-align:right" | 38
| style="text-align:right" | 69
| 
| 
|
|
|
|
|
|-
| 108Sr
| style="text-align:right" | 38
| style="text-align:right" | 70
| 
| 
|
|
|
|
|

References 

 Isotope masses from:

 Isotopic compositions and standard atomic masses from:

 Half-life, spin, and isomer data selected from the following sources.

 
Strontium
Strontium